Celso Pereira de Almeida (March 7, 1928 – May 11, 2014) was a Brazilian Catholic bishop.

Ordained to the priesthood in 1953, Pereira de Almeida was appointed auxiliary bishop of the Diocese of Porto Nacional in 1972. He was appointed coadjutor bishop of the same diocese in 1975 and became Bishop there in 1976. In 1995, he was appointed bishop of the Diocese of Itumbiara.

Pereira de Almeida resigned in 1998.

Notes

1928 births
2014 deaths
20th-century Roman Catholic bishops in Brazil
Roman Catholic bishops of Itumbiara
Roman Catholic bishops of Porto Nacional